"Heroes and Villains" is the thirteenth Christmas special episode of the BBC sitcom Only Fools and Horses, first broadcast on 25 December 1996 as the first part of the 1996 Christmas trilogy. It attracted a UK television audience of 21.3 million, at the time a record for the show. In the episode, Del and Rodney are invited to a fancy dress party. They arrive dressed as Batman and Robin.

Synopsis 
The episode opens with Rodney in a dystopian nightmare, in which Damien, head of the now multinational Trotters Independent Traders, apparently rules the Western world in the year 2026, forcing President Keanu Reeves to declare war on China, claiming that "war is good". Del Boy (who is now Lord of Peckham) and Raquel live in a lavish high-rise building, Trotter Towers, but Rodney himself is merely an old messenger, Cassandra is a maid (after Damien took over her bank and fired her), and Uncle Albert's body has been preserved (all he can say is his trademark phrase "During the war..." on a constant loop).

Rodney wakes up back in the present day on his birthday, on which he receives an identity bracelet from Del with the name "Rooney". Del's application for a council grant has been rejected, and Raquel receives a letter from her estranged parents, who want to meet her again. It emerges that Rodney and Cassandra have been trying for a baby, which leads to an unsuspecting Uncle Albert drinking one of Cassandra's urine specimens, believing it to be apple juice. Meanwhile, at Sid's café, Trigger is telling everyone about a medal he received from the local council for using the same broom for twenty years, despite the fact that it has actually had 17 new heads and 14 new handles in that time. Del buys tickets for himself and Rodney to attend a publican's fancy dress birthday party, Cassandra goes to Spain with her mother, and Raquel and Damien visit her parents.

At Del's request, he and Rodney go to the party dressed as Batman and Robin respectively, but their Reliant Regal van breaks down halfway there and they have to run the rest of the way. En route they interrupt an attempt to mug Councillor Murray, emerging from the fog dressed as Batman and Robin which scares away the thugs. Del and Rodney arrive at the party, unaware that the publican, Harry Malcolm, had in fact died the day before and the fancy dress has thus been cancelled in favour of a wake (a fact that Boycie, who met them in the doorway, "forgot" to mention), and they burst into the main room humming the Batman theme tune.

Del and Rodney are in the market the next day and see the gang of thieves again, this time robbing an elderly woman. Rodney gives chase, before one of the muggers then starts chasing him; Del eventually knocks the mugger unconscious with his suitcase. Del (though not Rodney, much to his frustration) receives a medal for apprehending the gang. While at the awards ceremony, he meets Councillor Murray again, who offers to do him a favour in return for saving her. That night Del announces that his application for a council grant has now been approved, and Rodney reveals that Cassandra is pregnant.

Episode cast

Reception
In a 2001 poll, Heroes and Villains was voted the UK's favourite Christmas show of all time, receiving 35% of the vote in a survey of 1,500 viewers.

Popular culture
The Batman and Robin scene from the episode was partially re-created by actors during the 2012 Summer Olympics closing ceremony.

Music
 M People: "Sight for Sore Eyes"
 UB40 & Chrissie Hynde: "I Got You Babe"
 The Children Of Dunblane: "Knockin' on Heaven's Door"
 Dodgy: "Good Enough"
 Boyzone: "Coming Home Now"
 Spice Girls: "2 Become 1"
 Neal Hefti: "Batman Theme"
 Del Boy & Rodney Trotter: "Three Lions"

References

External links
 
 

1996 British television episodes
1996 television specials
British television specials
British Christmas television episodes
Only Fools and Horses special episodes